Kolah Ghermezi and Bache Naneh (lit. "Kolah Ghermezi and the Spoilt Kid") is a 2012 Iranian film directed by Iraj Tahmasb.

Kolah Ghermezi's cousin,PesarAmeZa,That he stays at Iraj Tahmasb house from nowruz holidays,Explodes The house and because of the Neighbours complaint he goes to jail.

Sources

2012 films
Films directed by Iraj Tahmasb
Kolah Ghermezi
2010s Persian-language films
Iranian children's films